Rotenone is an odorless, colorless, crystalline isoflavone used as a broad-spectrum insecticide, piscicide, and pesticide. It occurs naturally in the seeds and stems of several plants, such as the jicama vine plant, and the roots of several members of Fabaceae.  It was the first described member of the family of chemical compounds known as rotenoids.

Discovery 

The earliest record of the now-known rotenone-containing plants used for killing leaf-eating caterpillars was in 1848, and for centuries, the same plants were used to poison fish. The active chemical component was first isolated in 1895 by a French botanist, Emmanuel Geoffroy, who called it nicouline, from a specimen of Robinia nicou, now called Lonchocarpus nicou, while traveling in French Guiana. He wrote about this research in his thesis, published in 1895 after his death from a parasitic disease. In 1902 Kazuo Nagai, Japanese chemical engineer of the Government-General of Taiwan, isolated a pure crystalline compound from Derris elliptica which he called rotenone, after the Taiwanese name of the plant 蘆藤 translated into Japanese . By 1930, nicouline and rotenone were established to be chemically the same.

Uses 

Rotenone is used as a pesticide, insecticide, and as a nonselective piscicide (fish killer). Rotenone has historically been used by indigenous peoples to catch fish. Typically, rotenone-containing plants in the legume family, Fabaceae, are crushed and introduced into a body of water, and as rotenone interferes with cellular respiration, the affected fish rise to the surface in an attempt to gulp air, where they are more easily caught.

In modern times it is frequently used as a tool to remove alien fish species, as it has a relatively short half-life (days) and is gone from rivers in the course of days and from lakes within a few months, depending on (seasonal) stirring, organic content, availability of sunlight and temperature. Rotenone has been used by government agencies to kill fish in rivers and lakes in the United States since 1952, Canada and Norway since 1980s. It is less frequently used in EU countries due to strict regulations, but has seen some use in some selected countries such as the UK (Topmouth gudgeon), Sweden (pike and pumpkinseed), Spain (Topmouth gudgeon, Gambusia) and Hungary (Prussian carp). 

Rotenone decays through metabolites and its final product is reduced to water and carbon dioxide. Furthermore, its use is more benign for the environment (as compared to other piscicides) as most species is seen to recolonize aquatic systems within weeks to a year after application. Thus, it has also seen some use in other field studies in the marine environment needing only small quantities. Small-scale sampling with rotenone is used by fish researchers studying the biodiversity of marine fishes to collect cryptic, or hidden, fishes, which represent an important component of shoreline fish communities, since it has only minor and transient environmental side effects.

It is commercialized as cubé, tuba, or derris, in single preparation or in synergistic combination with other insecticides. In the United States and Canada, all uses of rotenone except as a piscicide are being phased out. It is currently banned in the United States for any use in organic farming. In the UK, rotenone insecticides (sold under the trade name Derris) were banned for sale in 2009.

Rotenone is also used in powdered form to treat scabies and head lice on humans, and parasitic mites on chickens, livestock, and pet animals.

In agriculture it is also unselective in action and kills potato beetles, cucumber beetles, flea beetles, cabbage worms, raspberry beetles, and asparagus beetles, as well as most other arthropods.

Mechanism of action 
Rotenone works by interfering with the electron transport chain within complex I in mitochondria, which places it in IRAC MoA class 21 (by itself in 21B). It inhibits the transfer of electrons from iron-sulfur centers in complex I to ubiquinone. This interferes with NADH during the creation of usable cellular energy (ATP).  Complex I is unable to pass off its electron to CoQ, creating a back-up of electrons within the mitochondrial matrix.  Cellular oxygen is reduced to the radical, creating reactive oxygen species, which can damage DNA and other components of the mitochondria.

Rotenone also inhibits microtubule assembly.

Presence in plants 
Rotenone is produced by extraction from the roots and stems of several tropical and subtropical plant species, especially those belonging to the genera Lonchocarpus and Derris.

Some of the plants containing rotenone:
 Hoary pea or goat's rue (Tephrosia virginiana) – North America
 Jícama (Pachyrhizus erosus) – North America
 Cubé plant or lancepod  (Lonchocarpus utilis) – South America
 The root extract is referred to as cubé resin
 Barbasco (Lonchocarpus urucu) – South America
 The root extract is referred to as cubé resin
 Tuba plant (Derris elliptica) – southeast Asia and southwest Pacific islands
 The root extract is referred to as derris or derris root
 Jewel vine (Derris involuta) – southeast Asia and southwest Pacific islands
 The root extract is referred to as derris or derris root
 Common Mullein (Verbascum thapsus L.)
 Cork-bush (Mundulea sericea) – southern Africa
 Florida fishpoison tree (Piscidia piscipula) – southern Florida, Caribbean
 Several species of Millettia and Tephrosia in South-east Asian regions

Toxicity 
Rotenone is classified by the World Health Organization as moderately hazardous. It is mildly toxic to humans and other mammals, but extremely toxic to insects and aquatic life, including fish. This higher toxicity in fish and insects is because the lipophilic rotenone is easily taken up through the gills or trachea, but not as easily through the skin or the gastrointestinal tract. Rotenone is toxic to erythrocytes in vitro.

The lowest lethal dose for a child is not known, but death occurred in a 3.5-year-old child who had ingested 40 mg/kg rotenone solution. Human deaths from rotenone poisoning are rare because its irritating action causes vomiting. Deliberate ingestion of rotenone can be fatal.

The compound decomposes when exposed to sunlight and usually has an activity of six days in the environment. It oxidizes to rotenolone, which is about an order of magnitude less toxic than rotenone. In water, the rate of decomposition depends upon several factors, including temperature, pH, water hardness and sunlight. The half-life in natural waters ranges from half a day at 24 °C to 3.5 days at 0 °C.

A 2017 study, which examined the effects of rotenone administration on cell cultures that mimicked properties of developing brains, found that rotenone may be a developmental neurotoxicant; that is, that rotenone exposure in the developing fetus may impede proper human brain development, with potentially profound consequences later in life. The study found that rotenone was particularly damaging to dopaminergic neurons, consistent with prior findings.

Parkinson's disease 
In 2000, injecting rotenone into rats was reported to cause the development of symptoms similar to those of Parkinson's disease (PD). Rotenone was continuously applied over a period of five weeks, mixed with DMSO and PEG to enhance tissue penetration, and injected into the jugular vein.  The study does not directly suggest rotenone exposure is responsible for PD in humans, but is consistent with the belief that chronic exposure to environmental toxins increases the likelihood of the disease. In 2011, a US National Institutes of Health study showed a link between rotenone use and Parkinson's disease in farm workers, suggesting a link between neural damage and pulmonary uptake by not using protective gear. Exposure to the chemical in the field can be avoided by wearing a gas mask with filter, which is standard HSE procedure in modern application of the chemical.

Studies with primary cultures of rat neurons and microglia have shown low doses of rotenone (below 10 nM) induce oxidative damage and death of dopaminergic neurons, and it is these neurons in the substantia nigra that die in Parkinson's disease. Another study has also described toxic action of rotenone at low concentrations (5 nM) in dopaminergic neurons from acute rat brain slices. This toxicity was exacerbated by an additional cell stressor – elevated intracellular calcium concentration – adding support to the 'multiple hit hypothesis' of dopaminergic neuron death.

The neurotoxin MPTP had been known earlier to cause PD-like symptoms (in humans and other primates, though not in rats) by interfering with complex I in the electron transport chain and killing dopaminergic neurons in the substantia nigra. Further studies involving MPTP have failed to show development of Lewy bodies, a key component to PD pathology. However at least one study recently has found evidence of protein aggregation of the same chemical makeup as that which makes up Lewy bodies with similar pathology to Parkinson's disease in aged Rhesus monkeys from MPTP. Therefore, the mechanism behind MPTP as it relates to Parkinson's disease is not fully understood. Because of these developments, rotenone was investigated as a possible Parkinson-causing agent. Both MPTP and rotenone are lipophilic and can cross the blood–brain barrier.

In 2010, a study was published detailing the progression of Parkinson's-like symptoms in mice following chronic intragastric ingestion of low doses of rotenone. The concentrations in the central nervous system were below detectable limits, yet still induced PD pathology.

Notable administrations 
Rotenone was implemented in 2010 to kill an invasive goldfish population present in eastern Oregon's Mann Lake, with the intention of not disrupting the lake's trout population. Rotenone successfully achieved these aims, killing nearly 200,000 goldfish, and only three trout.

Beginning May 1, 2006, Panguitch Lake, a reservoir in the southeastern portion of the U.S. state of Utah, was treated with rotenone, to potentially eradicate and control the invasive population of Utah chub, which were probably introduced accidentally by anglers who used them as live bait. The lake was restocked with 20,000 rainbow trout in 2006; as of 2016, the lake's fish population has recovered.

In 2012 rotenone was used to kill all remaining fish in Stormy Lake (Alaska) due to invasive pike destroying native species, which were re-introduced once the treatment was concluded.
 
In 2014, rotenone was used to kill all remaining fish in San Francisco's Mountain Lake, which is located in Mountain Lake Park, in order to rid it of invasive species introduced since the migration of European settlers to the region.

Rotenone is used in biomedical research to study oxygen consumption rate of cells usually in combination with antimycin A (an electron transport chain Complex III inhibitor), oligomycin (an ATP synthase inhibitor) and FCCP (a mitochondrial uncoupler).

Deactivation 
Rotenone can be deactivated in water with the use of potassium permanganate to lower toxicity back down to acceptable levels.

See also 
 Fenpropathrin
 NADH dehydrogenase

References

External links 
 Rotenone, Molecule of the Month at chm.bris.ac.uk
 Cornell University.  Rotenone.  Resource Guide for Organic and Disease Management. 
 Rotenone. ARS Pesticide Properties Database
 Rotenone use in research on the biodiversity of marine fishes
 Rotenone Factsheet
 Rotenone registration at US Environmental Protection Agency
 CDC – NIOSH Pocket Guide to Chemical Hazards
 Rotenone at Bioblast
 Chemical Description

Aromatase inhibitors
Rotenoids
Hydroxyquinol ethers
Isoflavones
NADH dehydrogenase inhibitors
Plant toxin insecticides
Respiratory toxins
Microtubule inhibitors
Neurotoxins
Isopropenyl compounds